The Georgia State University Library is an academic research library affiliated with Georgia State University. The Georgia State University Library has two primary locations, Library North and Library South. In addition to hundreds of thousands of pieces of print media, the library also has online databases for electronic articles, as well as an electronic catalog for looking up media within the library’s many floors.  The media found in the library includes novels, journals, newspapers, government documents, archives, DVDs, CDs, video tapes, audio cassette tapes, and periodicals. The University Library is located in the middle of Georgia State's main campus near Gilmer St. and Courtland St.

Collections 

The library features over 1.5 million volumes which consist of 28,000 electronic journals, 2,800 periodicals over 820,000 government documents along with general texts. The Georgia State University Library includes 400 computer stations, 55 group study rooms, a quiet study room, and Saxbys Coffee Shop. The library is free and open to all Georgia State University Students, and costs $50 a year for the general public.

The library also allows access to the GALILEO network which connects students to a much larger network of journals, periodicals, magazines, etc. through a system of online sources.

History 
The Georgia State University Library, was established in 1948 as a branch of the University of Georgia Library. In 1951, the library purchased over 2,000 volumes from James Walter Mason. The original library staff only had three trained employees. After seven years of expansion, the library found a home in the second floor of Sparks Hall in 1955. The Sparks Hall facility contained a reading area and over 150,000 books. In comparison, the modern facility has its own building and is made up of multiple floors, and has more than ten times as much media as the Sparks Hall location had.

The present Assembly Hall (registration) area on the second floor of Sparks Hall became the library's home in 1955. The library traces its origins to a number of books that Dr. George Sparks donated from his personal collection to the Georgia Tech Evening School of Commerce in downtown Atlanta. Additional donations followed and included the commerce library of Professor Wayne S. Kell and a collection of city reports owned by former mayor James S. Key. The library soon required a building of its own to house its burgeoning collections. The first phase of construction resulted in a two-story building, which was completed in 1966. Three additional floors were added to the new library building during the second phase of construction in 1968. The building was completed in 1969, and the surrounding plaza was eventually landscaped.

Special Collections and Archives 
The Georgia State University Library also contains the Special Collections and Archives Department which collects and preserves rare historical materials in designated special subject areas.  These are open to view by students and the public, but cannot be checked out. Unique records and artifacts in the trust of the Special Collections Department & Archives, Georgia State University Library, may be loaned for the purpose of exhibits to educational and cultural institutions.

Carl and Gretchen Patton Children's Collection 
Carl Patton, once the president of Georgia State, and his wife Gretchen donated a large collection of children's books to the Library's existing children's section on the fourth floor of library north in 2003.  The collection consists of about 13,000 titles. "The Pattons’ gift represented an initial step toward raising $20 million to transform the main library into a 21st-century learning command central — a place where students routinely gather to conduct research, work on group projects, receive tutoring, study and socialize."

References

External links

Georgia State University